Her Son is a 1920 British silent drama film directed by Walter West and starring Violet Hopson, Stewart Rome and Mercy Hatton. It was based on the 1907 novel Her Son by Horace Annesley Vachell.

Cast
 Violet Hopson - Dorothy Fairfax 
 Stewart Rome - Dick Gascoyne 
 Mercy Hatton - Crystal Wride 
 Cameron Carr - David Hesseltine 
 John Stuart - Min Gascoyne 
 Mary Masters - Susan 
 Nicholas Hopson Worster - Min, as a child

References

External links

1920 films
1920 drama films
British drama films
British silent feature films
Broadwest films
Films directed by Walter West
Films based on British novels
British black-and-white films
1920s English-language films
1920s British films
Silent drama films